Elections for the City of Edinburgh District Council took place on Thursday 3 May 1984, alongside elections to the councils of Scotland's various other districts.

The election was the first time Labour had ever won a majority on the Edinburgh Council, with the party winning 34 of the City's 62 seats. The Conservatives came second, on 22 seats, whilst the SDP-Liberal Alliance won 4, and the SNP 2. Labour would retain its dominance for the next 23 years, until the 2007 election. Mark Lazarowicz and Nigel Griffiths played prominent roles in the election, and would later both become Edinburgh Members of Parliament for Labour. Alex Wood was the leader of the Labour group.

Following the election a red flag was raised above the Edinburgh City Chambers, but it was taken down after a day.

Aggregate results

Ward Results

References

1984
1984 Scottish local elections
May 1984 events in the United Kingdom
1980s in Edinburgh